Eric Stephen Schmitt (born June 20, 1975) is an American lawyer and politician serving as the junior United States senator from Missouri since 2023. A member of the Republican Party, Schmitt served as the Missouri Attorney General from 2019 to 2023, as Missouri State Treasurer from 2017 to 2019, and in the Missouri Senate from 2009 to 2017.

From 2009 to 2017, he was a member of the Missouri Senate, representing the 15th state Senate district. He also served as an alderman for Glendale, Missouri from 2005 to 2008, where he was one of two aldermen for Ward 3. Schmitt was elected Missouri's 46th state treasurer in 2016. On November 13, 2018, Governor Mike Parson named Schmitt attorney general of Missouri after the incumbent, Josh Hawley, was elected to the United States Senate. On November 3, 2020, Schmitt was elected to serve a full four-year term as Missouri's attorney general.

As attorney general of Missouri, Schmitt filed lawsuits to have the Affordable Care Act invalidated by courts, sued school districts and municipalities for implementing mask requirements during the COVID-19 pandemic, sued the Biden administration for its environmental policies, and signed onto an amicus brief that argued that LGBT people are not protected by workplace discrimination bans. He filed a lawsuit against China's handling of the pandemic, making Missouri the first U.S. state to do so. After Joe Biden won the 2020 election and Donald Trump refused to concede, Schmitt joined other Republicans in claiming fraud and supported lawsuits to invalidate the 2020 election results. In March 2021, he announced his candidacy for U.S. Senate. In 2022, Schmitt was elected to the U.S. Senate, defeating Democratic nominee Trudy Busch Valentine.

Early life and education
Schmitt was born in Bridgeton, Missouri, a suburb of St. Louis. He graduated from DeSmet Jesuit High School in 1993 and from Truman State University in 1997, with a Bachelor of Arts cum laude in political science. At Truman, Schmitt was a member of the Alpha Kappa Lambda fraternity, played football and baseball, and was a founding member of Truman's Habitat for Humanity chapter. He received a scholarship to attend Saint Louis University School of Law, where he earned his Juris Doctor in 2000.

For the fall 2018 semester, Schmitt was an adjunct faculty member at Saint Louis University.

Early law and political career

Lawyer and Glendale alderman
Schmitt was admitted to the Missouri bar in 2000. He was a partner at the firm Lathrop & Gage, LLP in Clayton, Missouri. Schmitt served as an alderman for Glendale, Missouri, from 2005 to 2008.

Missouri Senate (2009–2017)
On November 4, 2008, Schmitt was elected to the Missouri Senate. He represented the 15th district, which includes parts of central and western St. Louis County. Following the 2010 census, Schmitt's district was redrawn, but still centered around central St. Louis County. Schmitt ran unopposed in both the primary and general elections in 2012.

In 2016, Schmitt sponsored S.B. 572, which set a limit on the percent of revenue that Missouri local governments could obtain from non-traffic fines (such as fines for violation of city ordinances). The bill passed the state Senate in a 25–6 vote in January 2016. After the Ferguson unrest, Schmitt said that too many municipalities overrelied on fines to raise revenue and fund their budgets. He led the bipartisan legislative effort to bar cities, counties and law-enforcement agencies from setting traffic-ticket quotas. Schmitt worked with Senator Jamilah Nasheed and others on the legislation, which passed the State Senate in February 2016 and was enacted into law.

In 2010, Schmitt, who has a son with autism, supported a bill in the Missouri General Assembly that required health insurers to pay up to $40,000 annually to beneficiaries for applied behavioral analysis, a type of autism therapy. In 2015, he worked to enact legislation allowing Missouri residents to establish tax-exempt savings accounts for relatives with disabilities. Governor Jay Nixon signed the bill in 2015.

In the State Senate, Schmitt championed tax-cut legislation. He sponsored a major franchise tax cut, which passed. In 2013, he introduced legislation that would halve the state's corporate income tax and reduce taxes on C corporations. Schmitt and supporters promoted the tax as a way to match the Kansas experiment, while opponents called the taxes economically unsustainable. The legislation, enacted in 2014, also lowered state income taxes by 0.1% beginning in 2018.

Missouri State Treasurer (2017–2019) 
Schmitt did not run for reelection to the Missouri Senate in 2016 because he was term-limited. Instead, he filed to run for Treasurer of Missouri in the 2016 elections. Schmitt ran as a Republican and was unopposed in the Republican primary. He defeated Democrat Judy Baker and Libertarian Sean O'Toole in the general election.

Schmitt launched the MO ABLE program in 2017, which is similar to 529 college savings plans. He created the Show-Me Checkbook website which provides data on state spending, state revenues, payroll, debt obligations, and cash flow. In 2014, he sponsored legislation that made tax cuts when state revenues exceed financial triggers.

Missouri Attorney General (2019–2023)

Elections

2020 

Governor Mike Parson appointed Schmitt to the office of Attorney General of Missouri to succeed Josh Hawley, who was elected to the U.S. Senate in 2018. Schmitt took office in January 2019. In 2020, he was elected to another term.

Health care
Schmitt filed lawsuits to have the Affordable Care Act invalidated by courts. After Missouri voters approved a constitutional amendment to expand Medicaid coverage in the state, Schmitt supported Republican lawmakers who refused to implement the expansion.

COVID-19 pandemic
During the COVID-19 pandemic in Missouri, Schmitt filed lawsuits to prevent St. Louis County from implementing public health restrictions (such as restrictions on indoor dining, mask mandates and limits on gatherings) to reduce COVID-19's spread. He opposed the release of some inmates with violent felonies from jail during the pandemic, a measure that had been proposed to reduce COVID-19 spread in detention facilities.

Schmitt was involved in efforts to combat scammers and price gougers attempting to profiteer off COVID-19. In March 2020, he sued televangelist Jim Bakker and Morningside Church Productions, Inc. for falsely claiming that "Silver Solution" (colloidal silver) was an effective COVID-19 treatment.

On April 21, 2020, Schmitt filed a lawsuit in the U.S. District Court for the Eastern District of Missouri on behalf of the State of Missouri against the Chinese government, Chinese Communist Party, and other Chinese officials and institutions, alleging that their actions to suppress information, arrest whistleblowers, and deny COVID-19's contagious nature led to loss of life and severe economic consequences in Missouri. Missouri is the first state to sue China over the COVID-19 pandemic.

In August 2021, Schmitt sued local school districts in Missouri after they implemented mask mandates. In September 2021, he sued Jackson County, Missouri, for enforcing an order that required restaurants to comply with a mask mandate. In November 2021, the Missouri Department of Health concluded a study that found that mask mandates in Missouri reduced COVID-19 infections and deaths.

In 2021, Schmitt led a lawsuit against the Biden administration over its COVID-19 vaccine requirements for health care workers.

Environment
In 2021, Schmitt sued the Biden administration, challenging its decision to suspend new oil and gas leases on federal land and water. He and 13 other Republican state attorneys general also participated in a lawsuit seeking to block a Biden executive order directing federal agencies to consider the social costs of emissions of greenhouse gases (carbon, methane and nitrous oxide) in regulatory cost-benefit analyses.

In 2021, Schmitt and 21 other Republican attorneys general sued the Biden administration over Biden's revocation of the permit for the Keystone XL Pipeline.

Criminal justice
Schmitt launched the SAFE Kit Initiative in 2019 to reduce the backlog of untested sexual assault kits in Missouri. As of October 2021, thousands of kits remained to be tested.

In January 2020, Schmitt prosecuted a murder case in the City of St. Louis. The jury returned a quick verdict, finding Antonio Muldrew guilty of first-degree murder for shooting and killing Ethiopian refugee Abdulrauf Kadir at a convenience store in 2014. This was the first time a Missouri Attorney General prosecuted a murder case in the City of St. Louis.

Schmitt supported an effort in the Missouri legislature to increase the number of police officers in St. Louis City by lifting the residency requirement for police officers.

Under Schmitt, the AG's Office sued the city of Marshfield, Missouri, alleging that it maintained a ticket-quota system in violation of a state law banning such quotas (Schmitt sponsored the law in the General Assembly before becoming AG). In 2020, the suit ended in a settlement in which the city agreed to maintain a compliance program and have its state officials undergo training on the law.

On July 21, 2020, Schmitt filed "friend of the court" (amicus briefs) that argued that "Missouri's statutes specifically authorize Missouri citizens to use firearms to deter assailants and protect themselves, their families, and homes from threatening or violent intruders" and requested dismissal of cases filed by prosecutor Kimberly Gardner against Patricia and Mark Thomas McCloskey for brandishing firearms at protesters who had trespassed on their property while marching in St. Louis in 2020. Schmitt expressed concern about "the chilling effect that this [case] might have with people exercising their Second Amendment rights".

Antitrust

In September 2019, almost all 50 state attorneys general, including Schmitt, launched an antitrust investigation against Google. The bipartisan group of state AGs accused Google of prioritizing searches for companies that advertise on the search engine platform.

First Amendment
In August 2019, Schmitt withdrew a legal brief that argued that the First Amendment allowed government officials to withhold records from a Sunshine Law request, following criticism from transparency advocates who noted that the brief did not cite any case law. A Freedom Center of Missouri representative raised concern that the argument is similar to a case involving Governor Mike Parson, which Schmitt had not yet ruled on.

LGBTQ+ rights
In 2019, Schmitt was among 14 Republican state attorneys general signatories who signed an amicus brief to the Supreme Court brief arguing that the Civil Rights Act of 1964 does not protect LGBTQ+ people from employment discrimination. In June 2020, the Supreme Court ruled, 6–3, that employment discrimination on the basis of sexual orientation does violate the Civil Rights Act of 1964. In 2022, Schmitt was among 22 Republican state attorneys general who filed a lawsuit against the Biden administration over a program that prohibits discrimination based on sexual orientation and gender identity in schools that receive federal funds.

Religion and schools
In 2019, Schmitt spoke in defense of the Cameron R-1 School District after it came under criticism from the Freedom From Religion Foundation over a high school football coach who led students in prayer before and after games. The group contended that the practice violating the Establishment Clause of the First Amendment. In a letter, Schmitt called the foundation an "extreme anti-religion organization" and said he would support the coach, school, and school district if the group sued and said that no one was forcing students and players to participate in prayer in public spaces.

Texas v. Pennsylvania

After Joe Biden won the 2020 election, Schmitt's office supported the Trump campaign's attempt to invalidate ballots it claimed were illegally cast in Pennsylvania. Schmitt was among 17 Republican attorneys general who supported Texas attorney general Ken Paxton in suing Georgia, Michigan, Wisconsin, and Pennsylvania to invalidate their electoral votes for Biden and overturn the election results. The suit claimed that the four states' presidential vote tallies were unconstitutional; no evidence supported these claims and the arguments had already been rejected in other state and federal courts.

Because the suit was brought by one state against other states, the Supreme Court had original jurisdiction, though it frequently declines to hear such suits. There was no evidence of consequential illegal voting in the election. Paxton's lawsuit included claims that had been tried unsuccessfully in other courts and shown to be false. Officials from each of the four states said Paxton's lawsuit recycled false and disproven claims of irregularity. Legal experts and politicians sharply criticized the merits of the objections. Election law expert Rick Hasen called the lawsuit "the dumbest case I've ever seen filed on an emergency basis at the Supreme Court". Senator Ben Sasse said of Paxton that it "looks like a fella begging for a pardon filed a PR stunt", in reference to Paxton's own state and federal legal issues (securities fraud charges and abuse of office allegations). On December 11, the U.S. Supreme Court quickly rejected the suit in an unsigned opinion.

Wrongful conviction cases 
Schmitt has fought against motions calling for the release of Lamar Johnson, who was convicted for murder on the basis of a single eyewitness's testimony. A conviction integrity unit later found overwhelming evidence of Johnson's innocence. Schmitt also resisted the release on procedural grounds of Kevin Strickland, who has served 43 years, after the Jackson County prosecutor's office issued a public apology to Strickland on the basis of a wrongful conviction.

A September 2020 Kansas City Star investigation prompted prosecutors to review Strickland's case. In 2021, the prosecutor in the court of original jurisdiction wrote that he was innocent and deserved release, as did former Jackson County prosecutors and federal prosecutors for the United States District Court for the Western District of Missouri. Schmitt's assistant attorney general, Andrew Clarke, said their office believes Strickland to be guilty, that he should remain incarcerated, and that he had "worked to evade responsibility". In August 2021, Schmitt's office issued a subpoena requiring the Jackson County prosecutor to turn over any communication with third parties regarding the case, a demand she characterized as harassment.

United States Senator from Missouri

Elections

2022 

On March 24, 2021, Schmitt announced his candidacy for the United States Senate to succeed incumbent Republican Roy Blunt. His candidacy was backed by Missouri mega-donor Rex Sinquefield. In the speech announcing his candidacy, Schmitt tied himself to Donald Trump and railed against "the radical left". He has pledged to vote against Mitch McConnell for the Senate Republican party leadership position.

In April 2022, Schmitt repeated a Great Replacement-derived claim on Glenn Beck's program that the Democratic Party seeks to "fundamentally" change the country through Illegal immigration to the United States.

The day before the primary, former president Donald Trump released a statement endorsing "ERIC" [sic]. Schmitt was joined in the Republican primary by two other candidates with that name, former governor Eric Greitens and lesser-known candidate Eric McElroy. Trump's statement did not indicate whether it was an endorsement of one or multiple candidates, and when reached for comment by NBC News, Trump's office declined to clarify the endorsement, saying it "speaks for itself". Politico reported it as an endorsement of both Greitens and Schmitt, as Trump had apparently expressed indecision about which of the two to back before a dual endorsement was suggested; he separately contacted both to pledge his support, and each subsequently claimed the endorsement as his.

Schmitt won the Republican primary on August 2, 2022, with 45.6% of the vote. He won the general election with 55.4%, defeating Democratic nominee Trudy Busch Valentine by a margin of 13.2%.

Tenure 
Schmitt was sworn in on January 3, 2023, upon the opening of the 118th United States Congress by Senate President and Vice President Kamala Harris.

Personal life
Schmitt and his wife, Jaime, have three children. He and his family are Roman Catholic.

Electoral history

References

External links

 Official U.S. Senate website
Lathrop & Gage LLP – People – Eric S. Schmitt biography at his law firm

|-

|-

|-

|-

|-

|-

|-

|-

1975 births
21st-century American lawyers
21st-century American politicians
Living people
Missouri Attorneys General
Missouri lawyers
Republican Party Missouri state senators
Politicians from St. Louis County, Missouri
Republican Party United States senators from Missouri
Saint Louis University School of Law alumni
State treasurers of Missouri
Truman State University alumni